Goomba, Goombah, or Gumbah may refer to:

 Goombah, a slang term referring to people of Italian descent, mainly in the United States
 Goomba, a species from the Super Mario video game series
 Gumbah, a populated place in the Gumbax District, Bari, Somalia
 Goombah or gumbe, a Caribbean drum

See also
 Gumba (disambiguation)